The Dean of Peterborough is the head of the chapter at Peterborough Cathedral. On the Dissolution of Peterborough Abbey in 1539 and the abbey-church's refoundation as a cathedral for the new bishop and diocese of Peterborough, care for the abbey/cathedral church passed from an abbot to a dean. The current Dean of Peterborough is Chris Dalliston

List of deans

Early modern
1541–1542 Francis Leycester
(last prior of St Andrew's Priory, Northampton)
1543–1549 Gerard Carleton
1549–1557 James Curthoppe
1557–1559 John Boxall (deprived)
1560–1583 William Latymer
1583–1589 Richard Fletcher
1590–1597 Thomas Nevile
1597–1607 John Palmer
1607–1612 Richard Clayton
1612–1617 George Meriton
1617–1622 Henry Beaumont (later dean of Windsor)
1622–1630 William Piers
1630–1639 John Towers
1639–1640 Thomas Jackson
1640–1660 John Cosin
1661–1664 Edward Rainbowe
1664–1679 James Duport
1679–1689 Simon Patrick
1689–1691 Richard Kidder
1691–1707 Samuel Freeman
1707–1718 White Kennett
1718–1721 Richard Reynolds
1721–1722 Edward Gee

1722–1725 John Mandeville
1725–1740 Francis Lockier
1740–1744 John Thomas
1744–1764 Robert Lamb
1764–1791 Charles Tarrant
1791–1792 Charles Manners-Sutton
1792–1797 Peter Peckard

Late modern
1797–1822 Thomas Kipling
1822–1830 James Henry Monk
1830–1842 Thomas Turton
1842–1853 George Butler
1853–1878 Augustus Saunders (previously Headmaster of Charterhouse School)
1878–1890 John Perowne
1891–1892 Marsham Argles
1893–1901 William Ingram
1901–1908 William Barlow
1908–1928 Arnold Page
1928–1942 James Simpson
1943–1965 Noel Christopherson
1966–1980 Dick Wingfield-Digby
1981–1992 Randolph Wise
1992–31 March 2006 Michael Bunker
2006–2 October 2016 (ret.)  Charles Taylor
2 October 20169 October 2017 Jonathan Baker (Acting)
2017: Tim Sledge (dean-designate only: announced 27 August 2017, but withdrew his nomination due to personal health reasons)
9 October 201720 January 2018 Tim Alban Jones (Acting)
20 January 2018present Chris Dalliston

Notes

References

Sources
British History Online – Fasti Ecclesiae Anglicanae 1541–1857 – Deans of Peterborough
Peterborough City Council – Peterborough abbey (Peterborough Cathedral) 
British History Online – Houses of Benedictine monks: The abbey of Peterborough – A History of the County of Northampton: Volume 2 (1906), pp. 83–95. Accessed 29 May 2007.

 
Dean of Peterborough
Anglican Diocese of Peterborough
Peterborough-related lists